Fritz Grau (born 8 November 1894, date of death unknown) was a German bobsledder who competed in the 1930s. He won two bronze medals at the FIBT World Championships (two-man: 1933, four-man: 1930).

Grau was seriously injured, along with teammates Albert Brehme and Helmut Hopnaann, shortly before the 1932 Winter Olympics. He also finished sixth in the two-man event at the 1936 Winter Olympics in Garmisch-Partenkirchen.

References
Bobsleigh two-man world championship medalists since 1931
Bobsleigh four-man world championship medalists since 1930
Wallechinsky, David (1984). "Bobsled: Two-man". In The Complete Book of the Olympics: 1896-1980. New York: Penguin Books. p. 558.
"At Lake Placid". Time. 15 February 1932.

1894 births
German male bobsledders
Bobsledders at the 1936 Winter Olympics
Olympic bobsledders of Germany
Year of death missing